This is a list of parties in the world that consider themselves to be upholding the principles and values of green politics. Some are also members of the Global Greens, the European Green Party, the Nordic Green Left Alliance or other international organizations. Note that, in some cases, a party's self-described adherence to environmentalism may be disputed by its critics.

Alphabetical list by country

A
Albania
Green Party of Albania
Agrarian and Ambientalist Party 
Andorra
 Greens of Andorra
Argentina
 Green Initiative (2006–2010, defunct)
Armenia
 Green Party of Armenia
Australia
 United Tasmania Group (1972–1976, defunct)
 Conservative Party of Australia (1984)
 Australian Greens (since 1992)
 Nuclear Disarmament Party (1984–2009, defunct)
Austria
 The Greens – The Green Alternative

B
Belgium
 Ecolo (since 1980)
 Groen (since 1982)
Belarus
 Belarusian Green Party
Belize
 Belize Green Independent Party
Bolivia
 Green Party of Bolivia (since 2007)
Bosnia and Herzegovina
 Greens of Bosnia and Herzegovina
Brazil
 Green Party (since 1986)
 Sustainability Network
Bulgaria
 Green Party of Bulgaria (since 1989)
 The Greens (since 2008)
Burkina Faso
 Ecologist Party for the Development of Burkina
 Greens of Burkina
 Rally of the Ecologists of Burkina

C
Canada

 Green Party of Canada
  Green Party of Alberta
  Green Party of British Columbia
  Green Party of Manitoba
  Green Party of New Brunswick
  Green Party of Nova Scotia
  Green Party of Ontario
  Green Party of Prince Edward Island
  Green Party of Quebec
  Green Party of Saskatchewan
  Yukon Green Party
Chile
 Green Ecologist Party (since 2008)
Colombia
 Colombian Green Party (since 2005)
 Oxygen Green Party (founded 1998, defunct ca.2005)
Costa Rica
 Cartago Green Party
Croatia
 Sustainable Development of Croatia (since 2013)
 We Can! – Political Platform (since 2019)
Cyprus
 Movement of Ecologists — Citizens' Cooperation
Czech Republic
 Change (since 2012)
 Democratic Party of Greens (since 2009)
 Green Party (since 1989)

D
Democratic Republic of the Congo
 Rally of Congolese Ecologists – The Greens
Denmark
 The Alternative (since 2013)
 Red-Green Alliance (since 1989)
 Socialist People's Party (since 1959)
 Independent Greens (since 2020)
Dominican Republic
 Green Party of Democratic Unity

E
Egypt
 Egyptian Green Party (since 1990)
Estonia
 Estonian Greens (since 2006)

F
Fiji
 Green Party of Fiji
Finland
 Green League (since 1987)
France
 The Greens (1984–2010), merged with Europe Écologie into:
 Europe Ecology – The Greens

G
Georgia
 Green Party of Georgia (since 1990s)
Germany
 Alliance '90/The Greens (founded in 1979 as The Greens, merged in 1990 with Alliance 90)
 Ecological Democratic Party (since 1982)
 Klimaliste (since 2021)
 Mut (since 2017)
Greece
 Ecologist Greens (since 2002)
Guyana
Good and Green Guyana (founded 1994 – defunct 1997)

H
Hong Kong
 Citizens Party (from 1997 to 2008)
Hungary
 Dialogue for Hungary (since 2013)
 Politics Can Be Different (since 2009)

I
Iceland
 Left-Green Movement
Indonesia 
 Indonesian Green Party
Iran
 Green Party of Iran
Iraq
 Green Party of Iraq
Ireland
 Green Party (Ireland)
 Green Party in Northern Ireland
Isle of Man
 Isle of Man Green Party
Israel
 The Greens (Israel) (since 1997)
 The Green Party (Israel) (since 2008)
 Meretz
Italy
 Federation of the Greens (since 1990)
 Greens (South Tyrol)

J
Japan
 Midori no Tō Greens Japan

K
Kenya
 Mazingira Green Party of Kenya
Kosovo
 Green Party of Kosovo
Kurdistan
 The Green Party of Kurdistan (since 2008)

L
Latvia
 Latvian Green Party
Lebanon
 Green Party of Lebanon
Liechtenstein
 Free List
Lithuania
Lithuanian Green Party
Lithuanian Farmers and Greens Union
Luxembourg
 The Greens

M
Malaysia
 Green Party of Malaysia
Mali
 Ecologist Party of Mali
Malta
 AD+PD (founded in 1989 as Democratic Alternative, merged in 2020 with the Democratic Party)
Mauritius
 Les Verts Fraternels
Mexico
 Ecologist Green Party of Mexico (since 1993)
Moldova
 Ecologist Green Party (Moldova)
Mongolia
 Civil Will-Green Party
 Mongolian Green Party
Montenegro
 United Reform Action (since 2017)
 Greens of Montenegro (2002, defunct)
Morocco
 Izigzawen
Mozambique
 Greens Party of Mozambique

N
Nepal
 Hariyali
Netherlands
 GroenLinks (since 1989)
 Party for the Animals (since 2002)
New Zealand
 Values Party (1972, defunct)
 Green Party of Aotearoa New Zealand
Nicaragua
 Ecologist Green Party of Nicaragua
North Macedonia
 Democratic Renewal of Macedonia
Norway
 Green Party 
 Socialist Left Party (Norway)

P
Pakistan
 Pakistan Green Party
Papua New Guinea
 Papua New Guinea Greens
Peru
 Green Alternative Ecologist Party of Peru

Philippines 

 Philippine Green Republican Party
Poland
 The Greens
Portugal
 Ecologist Party "The Greens"

R
Romania
 Green Party
Russia
 Civil United Green Alternative (since 1991)
 Russian Ecological Party "The Greens" (since 1992)
 Union of Greens of Russia (established 2005; in 2006 joined Yabloko)
Rwanda
 Democratic Green Party of Rwanda

S
Saint Lucia
 The National Green Party - Saint Lucia
Saint Vincent and the Grenadines
 Saint Vincent and the Grenadines Green Party
Senegal
 Rally of the Ecologists of Senegal
Serbia
Greens of Serbia (since 2007)
Green Party (since 2014)
We Must (since 2022)
Do not let Belgrade drown (since 2015)
Together for Serbia (since 2012)
Slovakia
 Green Party
Slovenia
Greens of Slovenia
Youth Party – European Greens
South Africa
 Green Party of South Africa
Somalia
 Somalia Green Party
Spain
 Equo (since 2011)
Sweden
 Green Party
Switzerland
 Green Party of Switzerland (since 1983)
 Green Liberal Party of Switzerland (since 2007)

T
Taiwan
 Green Party Taiwan
Thailand
 Thai Forest Conservation Party
Tunisia
 Green Tunisia Party
Turkey
 Green Party (reestablished 2020)
 Greens and the Left Party of the Future (since 2012)

U
Uganda
 Uganda Green Party
Ukraine
 Party of Greens of Ukraine
United Kingdom
National
 Green Party of England and Wales
 London Green Party
 Wales Green Party
 Green Party (Ireland)
 Green Party in Northern Ireland
 Scottish Green Party
Other
 Alliance for Green Socialism
 Independent Green Voice
United States
 Green Party of the United States (since 1991)
 List of state Green Parties in the United States
Uruguay
 Green Eto-Ecologist Party (1987–2009)
 Ecologist Radical Intransigent Party (since 2013)
 Green Animalist Party (since 2018)
Uzbekistan
 Ecological Movement of Uzbekistan

V
Vanuatu
 Green Confederation
Venezuela
Ecological Movement of Venezuela

See also

Green party

References 

 
Green
Green